North Hagerstown High School is located at 1200 Pennsylvania Avenue, in Hagerstown, Maryland, United States. The school's colors are red and white, with black as the accent color. The school is part of the Washington County Public Schools system. North Hagerstown High School is fully accredited by the Maryland State Department of Education. It is the only school in Washington County to offer the International Baccalaureate Program.

Background
North Hagerstown High School opened in 1956 at the old Potomac Avenue location after the founding of South Hagerstown High School. The present location of the school on Pennsylvania Avenue was opened in 1958. The former mascot was the Little Heiskell, however the mascot is now a Hub.   North's mascot stems from the historical and geographical location of Hagerstown at the intersection of waterways, railroads, and interstate highways. Major highways intersect within the city, including Interstate 70 and Interstate 81. Just as these highways form the center or “Hub,” North Hagerstown proclaims its academic programs as center to students’ preparation for advanced education and vocations, enabling students to succeed. Hence, North is known as “The Hub of Better Learning.”

Recently the school opened a brand-new athletic facility, Mike Callas Stadium, that features a synthetic grass field and the largest free-standing scoreboard in the state of Maryland. The stadium's grand opening was on November 3, 2006, when the Hubs defeated Catoctin High School, 49-36. The stadium features bricks that were collected by alumni of the now-demolished Hagerstown High School, which was located on Potomac Avenue between the years of 1927 and 1958.

North Hagerstown High School recently received a silver rating in the U.S. News & World Report on America's Best High Schools, ranking in as 1020 in the country.

Notable alumni

 David Bitner, former Florida politician
 Aaron Brooks, freestyle and folkstyle wrestler
 Albert Lee Kaiss, Captain of Battleship U.S.S. Missouri
 Cathy Parson, pro basketball player/former Washington Mystics coach 
 Bruce Poole, former Maryland politician
 Anka Radakovich, Author and columnist
 Andrew A. Serafini, member of the Maryland House of Delegates
 George Sexton, lighting and museum designer

Principals 
David Reader (1998–2002) 
Robert Myers (2003–2005)
Valerie Novak (2005–2012)
Duane McNairn (2012–2014)
Peggy Pugh (2014–2015)
James Aleshire (2015–2021)
Michael Chilcutt (2021–present)

References

External links
North Hagerstown High School
Washington County Public Schools Official Site

Schools in Hagerstown, Maryland
High schools in Maryland
Educational institutions established in 1926
Public schools in Washington County, Maryland
International Baccalaureate schools in Maryland
1926 establishments in Maryland